Gabriel Iglesias Presents Stand Up Revolution was an American stand-up comedy television series airing on Comedy Central in the United States. Hosted by comedian Gabriel Iglesias, who is best known for his stand-up specials, the show features new material by both himself and other comedians. Each episode opens with a stand up by Iglesias before several other comedians perform, each of whom Iglesias usually introduces with an encore. The show debuted on October 6, 2011, and is executive produced by Iglesias. The program features Gabriel Iglesias as an emcee features new material and introduces two or three lesser known comedians looking for a big break on television. Each comedian presents a short set of jokes, which is edited to last about five minutes on the airing of the show.

Production
Before a season would start, Gabriel and the other comedians would perform on a bigger stage than the normal comedy clubs they would usually perform whenever the season starts. As the show started becoming more and more popular, Comedy Central decided to let Gabriel and his friends perform on television. For each season the show will have a different setting for example, the first season took place in Phoenix, Arizona. Iglesias' friend Martin Moreno appears as his sidekick similar to Conan O'Brien and Andy Richter's relationship. Gabriel also got Ozomatli to serve as the house band and got to write the show's theme song. Gabriel
wanted his show to be similar to John Oliver's New York Stand-Up Show but rather than having comedians people already knew, he wanted to introduce his lesser known friends who are comedians.

Episodes

Season 1 (2011)

Season 2 (2012)

Season 3 (2014)

Awards and nominations 
In 2012, the series was nominated for an ALMA Award for Favorite TV Reality, Variety, or Comedy Personality or Act.

Reception

A positive review came from Hector Saldaña of the San Antonio Express-News who praised Iglesias and the other comedians he assembled for the show, calling it "one of the all-time funniest comedy package tours" and Iglesias a "comedy genius".

Home video
On November 15, 2011, Gabriel Iglesias Presents Stand Up Revolution was released on DVD and Blu-ray containing the 7 episodes of  Gabriel Iglesias Presents Stand Up Revolution season one. Another DVD and Blu-ray release was released on December 26, 2012, with the six episodes of the second season.

See also
List of programs broadcast by Comedy Central

References

External links 
 
 Gabriel Iglesias' website
 

Comedy Central original programming
English-language television shows
2010s American late-night television series
2010s American stand-up comedy television series
2011 American television series debuts
2014 American television series endings
Comedy Central late-night programming